Gran Hermano VIP 7 was the seventh season of the reality television Gran Hermano VIP series. The season was launched in September 2019 on Telecinco. Jorge Javier Vázquez was the host of the show and Jordi González has been confirmed to be back as the host of the weekly Debate.

Housemates

Nominations table

Notes

Nominations total received

Debate: Blind results

Repechage 
Anabel, Nuria, Hugo, Dinio, Kiko, Irene and El Cejas would face an online voting that will decide which 3 of them will return to the house as candidates to officially become as official housemates.

The repechage was officially announced on Day 44 (October 24, 2019). The 3 most voted housemates entered the house on Day 47, Kiko was the housemate with fewest votes on Day 49 and Hugo was the most voted and became an official housemate on Day 51, therefore Diego was re-evicted.

Ratings

"Galas"

"Debates"

"Límite 48H" / "Límite 24H"

References

External links 
 Official site on Telecinco.es
 Gran Hermano Main Site
 Gran Hermano VIP 24 Hours

Gran Hermano (Spanish TV series) seasons
Telecinco original programming
2019 Spanish television seasons